The 1916 Indiana Hoosiers football team was an American football team that represented Indiana University Bloomington during the 1916 college football season. In their first season under head coach Ewald O. Stiehm, the Hoosiers compiled a 2–4–1 record and finished in eighth place in the Western Conference. They won games against  (20–0) and Florida (14–3), played Purdue to a scoreless tie, and lost to Chicago (22–0),  (12–10), Northwestern (7–0), and Ohio State (46–7).

Schedule

References

Indiana
Indiana Hoosiers football seasons
Indiana Hoosiers football